Saag also spelled sag or saga, is an Indian subcontinental leafy vegetable dish eaten with bread such as roti or naan, or in some regions with rice. Saag can be made from spinach, mustard greens, collard greens, basella, finely chopped broccoli or other greens, along with added spices and sometimes other ingredients such as chhena.

In India, it is common especially in the state of Odisha, where it is eaten with pakhala. In the Shree Jagannath Temple of Puri, saag is one of the dishes offered to Jagannath as part of Mahaprasad. Saag is also common in West Bengal and other regions of North India, where the most common preparation is sarson ka saag (mustard plant leaves), which may be eaten with makki ki roti, a yellow roti made with maize flour. Saag gosht or hariyali maans (spinach and mutton) is a common dish in the North Indian state of Haryana.

Etymology 
The word saag is derived from the Sanskrit word shaak (śāka) meaning leafy green vegetables.

Variations

Odisha
In Odia cuisine, sāga is one of the most important vegetables. It is popular all over the state. A large varieties of plants are used as sāga in Odisha. A list of the plants that are used as sāga is as below.
Kalama sāga (କଳମ ଶାଗ): Ipomoea aquatica (water spinach)
Kosalā/Khadā sāga (କୋସଳା ଶାଗ/ଖଡା ଶାଗ): prepared from amaranth leaves.
 Bajji sāga (ବଜ୍ଜୀ ଶାଗ): Prepared from Amaranthus dubius leaves.
Leutiā sāga (ଲେଉଟିଆ ଶାଗ) Amaranthus viridis leaves and tender stems.
Pālanga sāga (ପାଳଙ୍ଗ ଶାଗ) spinach
Sāga chhena (ସାଗ ଛେନା): Greens, especially spinach, with cottage cheese

Poi sāga (ପୋଈ ଶାଗ): prepared from basella leaves and tender stems.
Bāramāsi/sajanā sāga (ବାରମାସି/ ସଜନା ଶାଗ): prepared from leaves of the drumstick tree. Cooked with lentils or alone with fried onions.
Sunusuniā sāga (ସୁନୁସୁନିଆ ଶାଗ) Marsilea polycarpa leaves.
Pitāgama sāga (ପିତାଗମା ଶାଗ) Gilnus oppositifolius .
Pidanga sāga (ପିଡଙ୍ଗ ଶାଗ)
Kakhāru sāga (କଖାରୁ ଶାଗ): Prepared from leaves of the pumpkin plant.
Madarangā sāga (ମଦରଙ୍ଗା ଶାଗ): prepared from leaves of Alternanthera sessilis.
Sorisa sāga (ଶୋରିସ ଶାଗ) : Mustard greens
Methi sāga (ମେଥୀ ଶାଗ): prepared from methi or Fenugreek leaves and besara (mustard paste) cooked with vegetable.
Matara sāga (ମଟର ଶାଗ): The inner coating of peas is removed and then chopped to make the saga.
Bahal sāga
Kular sāga
Bhader sāga
Jhirel dal sāga

Bengali
In Bengali cuisine, sāg is one of the most important vegetables. It is popular all over the state. Most of the Bengalis use at least one sāg everyday during lunch. They eat sāg fried or little gravy (jhol) with rice. A list of the plants that are used as sāg is as below. 
Kalmi sāg Ipomoea aquatica (water spinach)
Kosalā/khadā sāg: prepared from amaranth leaves.
 Bajji sāg: Prepared from Amaranthus dubius leaves.
Leutiā sāg Amaranthus viridis leaves and tender stems.
Pālong sāg: spinach
Puin sāg : prepared from basella leaves and tender stems.
Bāramāsi/sojnā sāg: prepared from leaves of the drumstick tree. Cooked with lentils or alone with fried onions.
Sunusuniā sāg: Marsilea polycarpa leaves.
Pitāgama sāg 
Helencha sāg: Enhydra fluctuans
Daata sāg 
Peyanj sāg: prepared from spring onions 
Mulor sāg 
Lal sāg 
Lau sāg : Prepared from the leaves and stems of bottle gourd plant.
Kumro sāg: Prepared from leaves of the pumpkin plant.
Madarangā sāg: prepared from leaves of Alternanthera sessilis.
Sorshe sag: Mustard greens
Methi sāg: prepared from methi or fenugreek leaves and besara (mustard paste) cooked with vegetable.
Matara sāg: The inner coating of peas is removed and then chopped to make the sāga.

Bihar 
 
 Kalmi saag
 Munga saag
 Koira Saag
 Gandhari saag
 Koinar saag
 Chakod saag
 Sarla saag
 Chench saag
 Chimti saag
 Katai saag
 Dhhahdhhaa saag
 Golgola saag
 Khesaari saag (Lathyrus sativus)
 Poi saag (Basella alba)
 Palak saag (Spinach)
 Bathua saag (Chenopodium album)
 Methi saag (Fenugreek)

Jharkhand
There are around 70 variety of saag grows in Jharkhand. Some are as follows:
Beng saag
Bhaji saag
Kalmi saag
Khesari saag
Kohnda saag
Koinar saag
Methi saag
Munga saag
Palak saag
Pechki saag
Poi saag
Putkal saag
Sarla saag

Uttarakhand 
Saags (Leafy greens) are an important part of Garhwali, Kumaoni and Jaunsari cuisines of Uttarakhand. The abundance of leafy greens in the state are because of fertile land and forested land. Saags of Sarson (Mustard), Palak (spinach), Mooli (Radish) are common but unique and exclusive saags cooked in the state are:

Kandali saag or Bicchu ghas ka saag or Sisun ka saag (or stinging nettle leaves) is a wild bushy grass that is high on nutritional value but also itches if touched to bare skin. The leaves of this plant are boiled in hot water, turned into a paste and then cooked with ghee and tomato.

Lingdi ka saag: made using tender fern leaves.

Haryana 
Saag gosht or Hariyali Maans is a version of the dish prepared with meat often of mutton or lamb. This version of the dish is more common in the state of Haryana. The meat is usually cooked in a Bhatthi (clay oven) before being marinated in the other ingredients.

 In winters, saags of Channa/Cholia (chickpea leaves), Sarson (mustard), Methi (fenugreek), Palak (spinach), Bathua (chenopodium) are commonly cooked in Haryanvi households. These saags are mainly eaten with millet breads like Makki ki roti & Bajra ki roti, smeared with ghee or butter.

Punjab 
 Saag is usually made with mustard leaves in Punjab, although spinach is common in other parts of the world. Saag is commonly served hot, usually with roti (wheat bread), chapati, makki ki roti, bajra ki roti and topped with clarified butter.

See also 
Ghormeh sabzi
 Palak paneer
Sarson ka saag
Chhena
 Namul

References

5^cookingweb: sunsunia saag recipe in Hindi

Bihari cuisine
Indian curries
Punjabi cuisine
Bengali cuisine
Bangladeshi cuisine
Odia cuisine
Vegetarian dishes of India
Pakistani curries
Sindhi cuisine
Nepalese cuisine